Stephen Marc Adams (born 25 September 1980) is an English former footballer.

Club career
Adams began his career as a trainee with Plymouth Argyle, his hometown team, turning professional in August 1998. His first team debut came on 8 December 1998 when he was a second-half substitute (for Mike Heathcote) as Plymouth lost 2–0 away to Brentford in the first round of the Football League Trophy. He had to wait until 6 May 2000 for his league debut, playing in the 2–2 draw away to Mansfield Town. He was an ever-present member of the Argyle side that won the Third Division Championship in 2001–2002 and was rewarded with a new two-year contract at the end of the season.

He was also a vital member of the Argyle sides that won the Division Two title in 2003–2004.

He went on to make 176 appearances, scoring seven goals for Argyle before moving to Sheffield Wednesday, managed by former Plymouth manager Paul Sturrock, in March 2005 for an undisclosed fee. He signed a deal that would keep him at Hillsborough till 2007. His 2005–2006 season was hampered by an Achilles injury problem and Adams managed to make only eight appearances. Despite his injuries, former manager Sturrock rated him as one of his very best players. He was released by Sturrock's successor, Brian Laws, in May 2007. Adams had made 21 appearances in all competitions for Sheffield Wednesday.

Adams joined up with Sturrock again, signing for Swindon Town in August 2007 after a successful trial. In January 2008, Adams was offered a new short-term contract with Swindon until the end of the season but turned it down when Torquay United offered him a better contract. He had made six appearances in all competitions for Swindon.

Adams joined Conference National side Torquay United along with fellow Swindon Town midfielder Kaid Mohamed in January 2008. He made his debut on 28 January 2008 in the 1–0 win at home to Histon and made 15 starts in all competitions, as Torquay made both the play-off semi-final and the FA Trophy final.

Since then, he failed to cement a starting place at Plainmoor and made just two starts in all competitions the following season.

Adams signed for Forest Green Rovers on loan in August 2009 making seven appearances in a one-month loan spell.

In October 2009 Adams signed a 3-month loan deal with Truro City. This was extended on 16 January 2010 to the end of the season.

He was released by Torquay on 15 May 2010 along with six other players.

Honours

Plymouth Argyle
 2001–02 Division Three Champions
 2003–04 Division Two Champions

References

External links

1980 births
Living people
Footballers from Plymouth, Devon
English footballers
Association football defenders
Plymouth Argyle F.C. players
Sheffield Wednesday F.C. players
Swindon Town F.C. players
Torquay United F.C. players
Forest Green Rovers F.C. players
Truro City F.C. players
English Football League players